Wong Tak-bun (born 30 April 1963), known internationally as Kenny Wong, is a Hong Kong actor.

Filmography

References

External links
Kenny Wong at HKMDB

Living people
Hong Kong male television actors
TVB veteran actors
21st-century Hong Kong male actors
Hong Kong male film actors
20th-century Hong Kong male actors
1963 births